Badiga Ramakrishna (born 2 September 1942) was a member of the 14th Lok Sabha of India. He represented the Machilipatnam constituency of Andhra Pradesh and is a member of the Indian National Congress. He was defeated by the TDP's BC Candidate Konakalla Narayana Rao in 2009 Lok sabha elections by a meager margin of 12000 votes in a multi sided contest, where in PRP, Loksatta, BJP fielded candidates from the Kapu community and polled more than 2 lakh votes.

External links
 Official biographical sketch in Parliament of India website

1942 births
Living people
Indian National Congress politicians from Andhra Pradesh
India MPs 2004–2009
Telugu politicians
People from Krishna district
Lok Sabha members from Andhra Pradesh
Politicians from Vijayawada